The 2019 Castrol Toyota Racing Series was the fifteenth running of the Toyota Racing Series, the premier open-wheel motorsport category held in New Zealand. The series consisted of fifteen races at five meetings. It began on 10 January at Highlands Motorsport Park, in Cromwell, and concluded on 10 February with the 64th running of the New Zealand Grand Prix, at Circuit Chris Amon in Feilding.

The championship, as well as the 2019 New Zealand Grand Prix was won by rookie Liam Lawson; who became the first New Zealander to win the championship since Nick Cassidy in 2013.

Champion Liam Lawson and runner-up Marcus Armstrong both took five wins apiece, whilst Cameron Das, FIA Formula 3 European Championship driver Lucas Auer, Esteban Muth, Brendon Leitch and Artem Petrov all had one race win each.

Teams and drivers

Race calendar
The calendar for the series was announced on 19 June 2018, and will be held over five successive weekends in January and February.  Races 2 and 3 of the second round at Teretonga were postponed to due high winds and rescheduled.  Race 2 will be run at Hampton Downs, and Race 3 qualifying and race will be run at Taupo.

Championship standings

The series had introduced a new drivers' championship points system for the season.  Drivers were awarded the same number of points for Races 1 & 3.  Race 2 featured a reversed grid of the top 6 to 8 finishers from Race 1, and awarded reduced points to the top 15 finishers. Drivers must have completed 75% of the race distance and be running at the finish to score points.

Scoring system
Race (starting grid from qualifying)

Reversed grid Race

Drivers' championship

Footnotes

References

External links
 

Toyota Racing Series
Toyota Racing Series